Back to Your Arms is a 2010 Lithuanian drama film directed by Kristijonas Vildžiūnas. The film was selected as the Lithuanian entry for the Best Foreign Language Film at the 84th Academy Awards, but it did not make the final shortlist.

Cast
 Giedrius Arbaciauskas
 Andrius Bialobzeskis as Vladas
 Margarita Broich as Bettina
 Franz Broich-Wuttke
 Jurga Jutaite as Aukse
 Aleksas Kazanavicius
 Elzbieta Latenaite as Ruta
 Sandra Maren Schneider as Renate
 Sabin Tambrea

See also
 List of submissions to the 84th Academy Awards for Best Foreign Language Film
 List of Lithuanian submissions for the Academy Award for Best Foreign Language Film

References

External links
 

2010 films
Lithuanian-language films
2010 drama films
Lithuanian drama films